The Beaver River is a river in western Utah,  long, that drains to Sevier Lake via the Sevier River.

Description
Once it reaches the Sevier Desert south of Delta it turns west, joining the Sevier River and emptying into the intermittent, endorheic Sevier Lake.

The human population is about 3500, mostly concentrated in the town of Beaver. The river is dammed for irrigation in its upper reaches by Rocky Ford Dam, forming Minersville Reservoir.

See also

 List of rivers of Utah

References

External links

Rivers of Utah
Rivers of the Great Basin
Rivers of Beaver County, Utah
Rivers of Millard County, Utah